Thiamine-triphosphatase is an enzyme involved in thiamine metabolism. It catalyzes the chemical reaction

thiamine triphosphate + H2O  thiamine diphosphate + phosphate

This enzyme belongs to the family of acid anhydride hydrolases, specifically those acting on phosphorus-containing anhydrides. Its systematic name is thiamine triphosphate phosphohydrolase.

Structural studies

As of late 2007, only one structure has been solved for this class of enzymes, with the PDB accession code .

See also
 Thiamine-diphosphate kinase

References

 

EC 3.6.1
Enzymes of known structure